Chirodropus is a genus of box jellyfish in the family Chirodropidae.

Species
The World Register of Marine Species lists the following two species:
Chirodropus gorilla Haeckel, 1880 
Chirodropus palmatus Haeckel, 1880

References

Chirodropidae

Medusozoa genera
Taxa named by Ernst Haeckel